Musante is an Italian surname. Notable people with the surname include:

Camila Musante (born 1990), Chilean politician
Gerard Musante (born 1943), American psychologist
Lorenzo Musante (−1780), Italian pipe organ builder
Tony Musante (1936−2013), American actor

Italian-language surnames